Andy and Bill's law is a statement that new software will always consume any increase in computing power that new hardware can provide. The law originates from a humorous one-liner told in the 1990s during computing conferences: "what Andy giveth, Bill taketh away." The phrase is a riff upon the business strategies of former Intel CEO Andy Grove, and former CEO of Microsoft, Bill Gates. Intel and Microsoft had entered into a lucrative partnership in the 1980s through to the 1990s, and the standard chipsets in Microsoft Windows were Intel brand. Despite the profit Intel gained from the deal, Grove felt that Gates wasn't making full use of the powerful capabilities of Intel chips, and that he was in fact refusing to upgrade his software to achieve optimum hardware performance. Grove's frustration with the dominance of Microsoft software over Intel hardware became public, which spawned the humorous catchphrase; and, later, the law.

See also 
Jevons paradox
Moore's law
Wirth%27s law

References

Computer architecture statements